David McGregore (November 6, 1710 – May 30, 1777), also known as McGregor, MacGregore or MacGregor, was a Presbyterian Minister and Member of the Colonial America Christian Clergy. He brought his family and congregation of Scotch-Irish immigrants to America on five ships in 1718 and settled in a part of New Hampshire called Nutfield which today is known as the towns of Derry and Londonderry. Rev. David McGregor's sermons were very much ahead of his time and sheds light on the religious sentiments of colonial New England. He questioned the old scriptures and seems to have believed in experimenting in new beliefs and new forms of religion, which was considered very revolutionary for his time.

McGregor was the first minister of the West Parish of Derry and until he died in 1777, forty families from the East Parish worshiped in the West Parish and vice versa, West to East.  The residents chose to pay their worship tax to the adjacent town.  Seems the problems with the different religious sects truly divided the town.  The townspeople would cross paths on the way to worship.  People were known to carry their shoes for miles until they got to the church.

On June 3, 1720, at a public meeting it was voted that a small house be built “convenient for the inhabitants to meet in for the worship of God,” and it should be placed “as near to the center of the one hundred and five lots as can be convenience.” 
Reverend James McGregor claimed “there is just three kinds of songs. There is the very good song, the very bad song, and the song that is neither bad nor good. ‘While Shepherds Watch Their Flocks by Night’ is a very good song, ‘Janie Stoops Down to Buckle Her Shoe’ is a very bad song. But ‘Sue Loves Me and I Loves Sue’ is neither good nor bad.”

He was known to practice law in at least one instance
David McGregor was in one instance known to have practiced law. Around 1750 a wealthy resident of Portsmouth named John Odiorne received two letters demanding 500 pounds to be left at the western end of the long bridge between Kingston and Chester.  The letter threatened to burn Mr. Odiorne’s property and kill his family if the demands were not met. After the money was placed, a reputable citizen of Londonderry, Captain John Mitchell, happened along and dismounted his horse nearby.  A guard stationed to watch the loot arrested Captain Mitchell and charged him with the crime.  Mitchell protested his innocence and was unable to obtain an attorney for his defense.  Even though Captain Mitchell was not a member of Rev. David McGregore’s church, McGregore was convinced of Captain Mitchell’s innocence and offered to represent him.  Although Rev. McGregor had no knowledge of court proceedings, he managed to defend Captain Mitchell elegantly and presented a strong argument.  The court however convicted Captain Mitchell and fined him one thousand pounds.  Because he was unable to pay the fine he was placed in jail until Rev. McGregore paid a bail for his release.  After some time new evidence was discovered which proved his innocence and Captain Mitchell was acquitted.

His sermons
Trial of the Spirits - 1741
Professors Warned of Their Danger - 1741
The True Believer’s All Secured - 1747
The Christian Soldier - 1754
Address after the Right Hand of Fellowship - 1765
Christian Unity and Peace - 1765
An Israelite Indeed - 1774
The Voice of the Prophets Considered - 1776

"Trial of the Spirits" is a sermon about a controversy involving the Reverend John Wesley and letters from George Whitefield in August 1740.  "Professors Warned of their Danger" is directed at ministers of the gospel.  It is a guide to the minister of their responsibilities and duties as a teacher of the gospel.  It also warns them of the consequences of careless, insensitive and dangerous practices of their teachings. "The True Believer’s All Secured" seems to be aimed at assuring the people of God's promise to take care of the faithful.  "The Christian Soldier" is an ordination sermon, and David covers the duties and troubles of being a minister.

David McGregor’s gravestone

Memento mori
Etsi mors indies accelerat tamen
Virtus post Funera vivet
Here lies the dust of him who did proclaim
Salvation to lost souls in Jesus’ Name
His Master dated to give the great reward
To those who here flock of Christ regard
The Rev Mr. David MacGregore Son of
The Rev. James MacGregore first
Minister in Londonderry
Deceased the 30th of May AD 1777
In the 68th year of his age
To his memory this monument
Is erected by his Relict and Children

Mrs. Mary MacGregore
Reelect of
Rev. David McGregore
Died Sept 28, 1793
Aet 70

David McGregor's notable family and descendants
David McGregor's daughter Margaret married Captain James Rogers, brother of the famous Major Robert Rogers of Rogers' Rangers.  First Lady Jane Means Appleton, wife to President Franklin Pierce, was David McGregor's great-granddaughter. One son of David McGregor's, Robert McGregor Esquire (1749–1816) built the first bridge over the Merrimack River in August and September 1792. This bridge was known as McGregor's Bridge and crossed the river from near his home in Goffstown on the west side to what is today Bridge Street in Manchester, New Hampshire.  Today McGregor Street parallels the river on the west side along the old Amoskeag Mill building. Another son of David McGregor's, James McGregor (1748–1818) was a New Hampshire state senator representing Rockingham County for two years (1793–1794).  David's father, James McGregor, is thought to be a first cousin of the famous Robert Roy MacGregor. David's grandfather was Colonel David McGregor who was born in Balquhidder, Perthshire, Scotland, the same location of Rob Roy MacGregor's burial.  James insisted he was Scottish and not Irish.  US Senator John Kerry is also a descendant of David McGregor.

References

 Descendants of James Rogers, Father of the Rangers. 
 The Works of Reverend David McGregor 2009 by William M. Gorman, Puplished by Heritage Books 
 Rising Above Circumstances by Robert J. Rogers U.E.
 New Hampshire Historical Society
 Derry Museum of History & Richard Holmes
 University of New Hampshire at Durham
 United States Library of Congress
 Chester Historical Society (Vermont)
 Immigrants in the Land of Canaan – Miller, Schrier, Boling, Doyle

1710 births
1777 deaths
People of New Hampshire in the French and Indian War
People of colonial New Hampshire
People of colonial Massachusetts
Clergy from Derry (city)
Kingdom of Ireland emigrants to the Thirteen Colonies
People from Manchester, New Hampshire
American people of Scotch-Irish descent
People from Rockingham County, New Hampshire